Richwood Evangelical Lutheran Church, also known as Cross Roads Lutheran Church, is a historic Lutheran church at 9700 West County Road 700 South in the unincorporated town of Cross Roads in Salem Township, Delaware County, Indiana, USA. It was built in 1868, and is a one-story, Gothic Revival style brick building with a bell tower.  A rear addition, vestibule, and stained glass windows were added in 1915.

It was added to the National Register of Historic Places in 2004.

References

Lutheran churches in Indiana
Churches on the National Register of Historic Places in Indiana
Gothic Revival church buildings in Indiana
Churches completed in 1868
Churches in Delaware County, Indiana
National Register of Historic Places in Delaware County, Indiana